Francesco Acquaroli may refer to:

Francesco Acquaroli (actor) (born 1962), Italian actor
Francesco Acquaroli (politician) (born 1974), Italian politician